Brigitte Secard is a Syrian American author of non-fiction and Self empowerment. She is also the founder of the "Brave New Peace Campaign" and has written and published several different books based upon her ongoing work on the deconstruction of modern human suffering while also helping to teach and evolve our current models of social change for this generation.

Early life and education
At age 8 and acutely aware of how widespread and unsolved human suffering was, Brigitte began teaching herself Swahili because she had hoped to go and live on the Serengeti. During that time, she began calling game preserves to try and bring lion cubs to the hillside where she lived. She soon received a visit from Lt Dan Leonard of the West Covina Police Department, who attempted to explain the dangers of a child living with lions. She sat and explained to him her idea of how she and these lions could together show the power of peace. Officer Leonard told her he hoped she could show the world that, but without the lions.

Brigitte attended Sacred Heart Catholic School for her 6th and 7th grade years and was then asked to leave due to upsetting the nuns with too many questions about historical incongruences within the doctrine of the Catholic Church. At age 12 in the 8th grade at Hollenbeck Junior High School, she gave her annual school project on "Abortion and The Need For Improved Male contraceptive." Because of how well received the project was, Brigitte was asked to give the same presentation to the entire faculty and parents of the school. At age 15 she left home and moved to Humboldt County, California. At 16, she became Opinions Editor of the school newspaper and president of the vocal jazz ensemble at Eureka High School. She was chosen to be the singer at the high school graduation ceremony.

Brigitte attended Sacramento State University to study political theory, philosophy, international relations and the psychology of death. She was the first woman to be enrolled in the Men's Boxing Program at Sacramento State under Coach Hank Elespuru. At age 22, she was invited by world renowned martial artist June Castro, to join her as the first women to train at Fairtex Muay Thai Academy in Arizona.

Career
At 21 she worked for Pamela Anderson in order study the imagery of womanhood and modern sexuality in media. At age 23 she was hired to work directly with Bill Maher on the ABC show Politically Incorrect. She voluntarily quit the position after nine months as an act of conscience to "help solve the world’s problems instead of help make entertainment out of them.”

At age 25 she released a musical album with Freedom Zone which she recorded over the span of one week after writing songs with Oji Pearce and Preston Glass. After the events of 9/11, at age 28 she wrote her first book, Soulfire: The Birth of Wild Aliveness between Christmas Eve and New Years 2002. On June 23, the book was launched at The Knitting Factory in Hollywood, where Reverend James Lawson (American activist) delivered the keynote, calling her work "The next generation of change." The book was published that September in 2003 and Brigitte began a nationwide book tour in 2004. The concept of Self-compassion was first introduced to the public at this time.

In 2005, as an early IHRC Goodwill ambassador at the United Nations in Geneva; Brigitte spoke before the Working Group on Indigenous Populations about her trip to Africa which was just weeks prior. On June 16, 2005, she flew into Johannesburg South Africa to attend the National Youth Day commemoration at the personal invite of Zindzi Mandela held at Orlando Stadium in Soweto. During her time in South Africa, she was interviewed by Kaya FM and gave a speech at Gandhi Square on evolving the legacy of Mahatma Gandhi, Martin Luther King Jr., Malcolm X, and Nelson Mandela. As the private guest of the Nelson Mandela family, she was given an opportunity to interview Ela Gandhi, the granddaughter of Mahatma Gandhi on the subject of the modern human condition.

In the following year, Brigitte keynoted at different events around the United States such as the Women Of Wisdom International Women's Conference in Washington. She was also a frequent guest on Playboy Radio during this time, introducing new paradigms for modern womanhood and sexuality in society. Brigitte's first televised television appearance was on Si TV’s The Rub, hosted by Kerri Kasem, Sam Sarpong, and Diego Varas.
 
From 2006 to 2008 she wrote, produced and directed a documentary "Generation Instant Gratification" which included the interview with Ela Gandhi.
 
In 2009, Brigitte hosted and produced a radio show out of Seattle, interviewing noted leaders such as Dr. Horace Huntley from the Birmingham Civil Rights Institute, Charles Barber from Yale, and Lew Rockwell from the Mises Institute. 
 
On September 11, 2012, she hosted a free screening of the movie Samsara (2011 film) at Laemmle Theatres where she interviewed the filmmakers and composer, Mark Magidson and Composer Marcello De Francisci. 
 
In 2013, Brigitte moved to the art district of Los Angeles where she wrote, narrated, produced and directed a YouTube docu-series together with The Brave New Peace Campaign, which was filmed at the Watts Towers and throughout downtown Los Angeles, with music from Nasimiyu and War Dolphin.
 
In May 2015, she was one of the opening day speakers at the festival Lightning in a Bottle where she spoke on "Revolutionizing Revolution" one of the topics from her book, "Ending The War Within: Why The World Needs More Than The Buddha, The Dalai Lama, and The Pope."

In April 2016, she lobbied the Arts District Business Improvement District to help create a community beautification project in the neighborhood.

In November 2017, Brigitte was nominated & elected to serve on the Board of the Los Angeles River Artists and Business Association (LARABA), a 501(c)4 community organization, to improve the quality of life for the Arts District by encouraging a lively and healthy social, cultural development.

In January 2018, she was asked to serve as Guest Professor for Dr. Melanie Horn's class at Whittier College on the subject of Death and to discuss her new Paradigm on this topic.

References

American non-fiction writers
Living people
Writers from Los Angeles
Writers from California
American people of Syrian descent
Year of birth missing (living people)
People from West Covina, California